Jonathan Robert Tomkinson (born April 11, 2002) is an American professional soccer player who plays as a defender for Stevenage, on loan from EFL Championship club Norwich City.

Career
Tomkinson is a former United States youth international. He was formerly a midfielder and even spent a season on the wing playing for the FC Dallas Academy team before moving back in an emergency when a shortage of center-backs arose. It was during the 2019–20 season that Tomkinson began playing for Norwich City Under-18s. He signed a professional contract for Norwich City in January 2022.

Tomkinson made his professional debut on August 9, 2022, in Norwich's EFL Cup first round match at home to Birmingham City. He conceded an own goal as the match ended 2–2, with Norwich winning following a penalty shoot-out.

On January 13, 2023, Tomkinson joined League Two side Stevenage on loan for the remainder of the 2022–23 season.

Career statistics

References

2002 births
Living people
Norwich City F.C. players
Stevenage F.C. players
American soccer players
Soccer players from Texas